Hranush Tovmasyan (born March 29, 1982) is an Armenian linguist and translator.

Education
Hranush Tovmasyan was born and raised in Yerevan, Armenian SSR. Tovmasyan received a qualification of specialist of English and Spanish languages, teacher from Brusov State University which she entered in 1999 and graduated with honor in 2004. Right after that in 2005 Hranush was enrolled in a postgraduate study program at the same university which she accomplished in 2007 defending her PhD dissertation and earning the degree of Doctor of Linguistics (General and Applied Linguistics). In June–July 2008 Tovmasyan was a post-doc fellow at Cambridge University in UK, funded jointly by Open Society Institute Assistance Foundation and Cambridge University. Hosted by Darwin College, her fellowship passed at the Department of Theoretical and Applied Linguistics of Cambridge University. She carried out her research in Pragmatics, Presupposition being her spotlight. In 2009 Hranush Tovmasyan was granted the academic title of Associate Professor in Linguistics from Yerevan Brusov State Linguistic University. In August 2010, 2011 and 2012 Tovmasyan studied at University for Foreigners of Perugia, attending the course of Italian language and culture. In 2011 she launched her doctoral research which resulted in her dissertation “Lingvo-Cognitive Aspect of Presupposition as a Text Cohesion Means.” In 2018 she defended her Doctoral dissertation at the Institute of Language of the National Academy of Sciences of Armenia, earning the academic degree of Doctor of Philological Sciences (General and Comparative Linguistics). In 2022 Hranush Tovmasyan was granted the academic title of  Professor in Linguistics.

Career
Hranush Tovmasyan started her academic career at Yerevan Brusov State Linguistic University as a lecturer in 2004, followed by her step by step career progression to Associate Professor in 2009. In 2006 she launched her translation career getting a contract with the National Gallery of Armenia, which was then followed by a contract with OSCE/ODIHR as an interpreter for 2008 Presidential Elections Observation Mission. This contract served as a step for another contract with OSCE/ODIHR as an interpreter for the series of trials on “1 March Events.” In 2006, as a freshman in research, she was bestowed the Council of Young Scientists at Yerevan Brusov State Linguistic University as a Chairperson. She chaired the Council till 2010 upon taking up the position of the head of the Chair of English Phonetics and Grammar at the same university. She quit the position in February 2013. In November–December 2010 Tovmasyan was contracted by the Government of Armenia to translate the official website of the National Gallery of Armenia in English and Russian. In 2012 Hranush Tovmasyan was contracted by the Ministry of Justice of Armenia as an expert translator in English to license notary public translators for a two-year term. Between 2010 and 2015 she was member of Yerevan Brusov State Linguistic University Governing Board. In 2011 she was bestowed membership in the Armenian Association for the Study of English at Yerevan State University which she gave up in 2019. Since 2019 Dr Tovmasyan has been an expert of academic degrees issuing program at Supreme Certifying Committee of Armenia and a standing member of 009 “Foreign Languages” specialized academic council based in Yerevan State University. In November–December 2019 Dr Tovmasyan jointly with the Supreme Certifying Committee initiated and authored "Research Literacy and Integrity" program for PhD students all over Armenia and read a lecture in its scope. Since 2020 Hranush has been an ANQA (National Center for Professional Education Quality Assurance Foundation) expert of higher education accreditation. She has teaching contracts with some local universities.

Throughout her career Hranush has participated in range of conferences and workshops both in Armenia and abroad. 
Dr Tovmasyan has authored numerous research publications and a university handbook.

Hranush Tovmasyan has had an active voluntary experience volunteering in Armenia, France and Germany.

Dr Tovmasyan speaks Armenian, English, Russian, Spanish and Italian languages.

Publications

 English Studies in Albania. Volume 9, Issue 1, Page 73-84. Anaphoric deixis as presupposition triggerHranush TOVMASYAN, Yerevan Brusov State University of Languages and Social Sciences, Armenia. 
 Товмасян Г.Ж.Прагмасемантический анализ активаторов пресуппозиций  
 On Text Coherence via Frame-Based Presuppositions
 The Speaking Individual’s Presupposition Base as a Reflection of the Picture of the World and the Linguistic Picture of the World  Hranush Tovmasyan Yerevan Bryusov State University of Languages and Social Sciences
 Text cohesion via the presupposition base realized through antonymy of language units
 Text cohesion via the presupposition base realized through antonymy of language units
 Text cohesion via the presupposition base realized through antonymy of language units
 EXT COHESION VIA THE PRESUPPOSITION BASE REALIZED THROUGH SYNONYMY OF LEXICAL UNITS TOVMASYAN HRANUSH ZH.
 Austrian Journal of Humanities and Social Sciences
 Text cohesion via the presupposition base realized through antonymy of language units
 Developing listening skills and pronunciation / by Tovmasyan, H; Kocharyan, M.
 ԹովմասյանՀ.Ժ. Տեքստի ներկապակցումը եւ ամբողջականությունը կանխենթադրութային հենքի լեզվական ճանաչողական կառույցների միջոցով

References

1982 births
Living people
Armenian women scientists
Writers from Yerevan
Linguists from Armenia
Armenian translators
Yerevan Brusov State University of Languages and Social Sciences alumni